Pande Petrovski (26 December 1943 – 31 December 2006) was a Macedonian general and the Chief of Staff of the Army of the Republic of Macedonia. He was most famous for being the strategist that planned the military actions of the Macedonian security forces during the 2001 insurgency in the Republic of Macedonia.
He is the author of the book Testimonies 2001.

See also
2001 insurgency in the Republic of Macedonia
Operation MH - 1
Operation MH - 2
Operation Vaksince
Operation Arachinovo
Operation Radusha

References

1943 births
2006 deaths
People from Bitola Municipality
Yugoslav Macedonia
Yugoslav People's Army personnel
Macedonian Christians
Macedonian writers
2001 insurgency in Macedonia
Army of North Macedonia personnel